This is a list of school districts in North Dakota, grouped by county.

History
In the 1998-1999 school year, the state had 221 school districts with 113,300 students. In January 2007, the number of school districts had declined to 195, and these districts had a total of 95,600 students. The eight largest school districts, which had 48,900 of those students, had their combined enrollment decline by 8% from 1998-1999 to 2006-2007. The remaining districts lost 23% of their students from 1998-1999 to 2006-2007.

Adams County
 Hettinger Public School District

Barnes County

 Barnes County North School District
 Oriska Public School District
 Valley City Public School District

Benson County

 Leeds Public School District
 Fort Totten Public School District
 Maddock Public School District
 Minnewaukan Public School District
 Oberon Public School District
 Warwick Public School District

Billings County
 Billings County Public School District 1

Bottineau County

 Bottineau Public Schools
 Newburg-United Public School District
 Westhope Public School District
 Willow City Public School District

Bowman County

 Bowman County Public School District 1
 Scranton Public School District

Burke County

 Bowbells Public School District 14
 Burke Central Public School District 36
 Powers Lake Public School District

Burleigh County

 Apple Creek Public School District 39
 Bismarck Public School District 1
 Bismarck Special Education Unit
 Bismarck Technical Center
 Burleigh County Special Education Unit
 Driscoll Public School District
 Manning Public School District
 McKenzie Public School District
 Menoken Public School District
 Naughton Public School District
 Regan Public School District
 Sterling Public School District
 Wing Public School District

Cass County

 Central Cass Public School District
 Fargo Public School District
 Kindred Public School District
 Maple Valley Public School District
 Mapleton Public School District
 Northern Cass Public School District
 West Fargo Public Schools

Cavalier County

 Border Central Public School District
 Langdon Area Public School District
 Milton Public School District
 Munich Public School District
 Osnabrock Public School District

Dickey County

 Ellendale Public School District
 Oakes Public School District

Divide County
 Divide County Public School District

Dunn County

 Dodge Public School District
 Halliday Public School District
 Killdeer Public School District
 Twin Buttes Public School District

Eddy County

 East Central Special Education District
 New Rockford-Sheyenne Public School District

Emmons County

 Bakker Public School District 10
 Hazelton-Moffit-Braddock Public School District
 Linton Public School District
 Strasburg Public School District

Foster County

 Carrington Public Schools
 Midkota Public School District 7

Golden Valley County

 Beach Public School District 3
 Lone Tree Public School District

Grand Forks County

 Emerado Public School District
 Grand Forks Public School District
 Larimore Public School District
 Manvel Public School District
 Midway Public School District
 Northwood Public School District
 Thompson Public School District

Grant County

 Elgin-New Leipzig Public School District
 Roosevelt Public School District

Griggs County
 Griggs County Central Public School District

Hettinger County

 Mott-Regent Public School District
 New England Public School District

Kidder County

 Steele-Dawson Public School District
 Robinson Public School District
 Tappen Public School District
 Tuttle-Pettibone Public School District

LaMoure County

 Edgeley Public School District
 Kulm Public School District
 LaMoure Public Schools
 Litchville-Marion Public School District

Logan County

 Gackle-Streeter Public School District
 Napoleon Public School District
 South Prairie Special Education District

McHenry County

 Anamoose Public School District 14
 Drake Public School District
 Granville Public School District
 Newport Public School District
 TGU Public School District
 Upham Public School District
 Velva Public School District

McIntosh County

 Ashley Public School District 9
 Wishek Public School District
 Zeeland Public School District

McKenzie County

 Alexander Public School District 2
 Bowline Butte Public School District
 Horse Creek Public School District
 Mandaree Public School District
 McKenzie Co Public School District
 Yellowstone Public School District

McLean County

 Butte Public School District
 Garrison Public School District
 Max Public School District
 Montefiore Public School District
 Turtle Lake-Mercer Public School District
 Underwood Public School
 Washburn Public School District
 White Shield Public School District
 Wilton Public School District

Mercer County

 Beulah Public School District 27
 Golden Valley Public School District
 Hazen Public School District
 Stanton Public School District

Morton County

 Flasher Public School District
 Glen Ullin Public School District
 Hebron Public School District
 Little Heart Public School District
 Mandan Public School District
 New Salem Public School District
 Sweet Briar Public School District

Mountrail County

 New Town Public School District
 Parshall Public School District
 Plaza Public School District
 Stanley Public School District

Nelson County

 Dakota Prairie Public School District
 Lakota Public School District

Oliver County
 Center-Stanton Public School District

Pembina County

 Cavalier Public School District
 Drayton Public School District
 Neche Public School District
 Pembina Public School District
 Saint Thomas Public School District
 Valley Public School District
 Walhalla Public School District

Pierce County
 Rugby Public School District

Ramsey County

 Devils Lake Public School District
 Edmore Public School District
 Starkweather Public School District

Ransom County

 Enderlin Public School District
 Fort Ransom Public School District
 Lisbon Public School District
 Salund Public School District
 Sheldon Public School District

Renville County

 Glenburn Public School District
 Mohall Lansford Sherwood School District

Richland County

 Fairmount Public School District
 Hankinson Public School District
 Lidgerwood Public School District
 Mantador Public School District
 Richland Public School District
 Wahpeton Public School District
 Wyndmere Public School District

Rolette County

 Dunseith Public School District
 Mount Pleasant Public School District
 Rolette Public School District
 Saint John Public School District
 Belcourt Public School District 7

Sargent County

 Milnor Public School District
 North Sargent Public School District
 Sargent Central Public School District

Sheridan County

 Goodrich Public School District
 McClusky School District

Sioux County

 Fort Yates Public School District
 Selfridge Public School District
 Solen Public School District

Slope County
 Marmarth Public School District

Stark County

 Belfield Public School District 13
 Dickinson Public Schools
 Richardton-Taylor Public School District
 South Heart Public School District

Steele County

 Finley-Sharon Public School District
 Hope-Page Public Schools

Stutsman County

 Buffalo Valley Special Education Unit
 Jamestown Public Schools
 Kensal Public School District
 Medina Public School District
 Montpelier Public School District
 Pingree-Buchanan Public School District
 Spiritwood Public School District

Towner County

 North Star Schools
 Southern Public School District

Traill County

 Central Valley Public School District
 Hatton Public School District
 Hillsboro Public School District
 May-Port CG Public School District

Walsh County

 Edinburg Public School District
 Fordville-Lankin Public School District
 Grafton Public School District
 Minto Public School District
 Nash Public School District
 Park River Public School District

Ward County

 Bell Public School District 10
 Eureka Public School District
 Kenmare Public School District
 Lewis and Clark Public School District
 Minot Public School District
 Nedrose Public School District
 North Shore Public School District
 Sawyer Public School District
 Surrey Public School District
 United Public School District

Wells County

 Fessenden-Bowdon Public School District
 Harvey Public Schools
 Pleasant Valley Public School District

Williams County

 Eight Mile Public School District
 Grenora Public School District
 Nesson Public School District
 Tioga Public School District
 Wildrose-Alamo Public School District
 Williston Basin School District 7

See also
List of high schools in North Dakota
List of defunct high schools in North Dakota
List of high schools in the United States

References

Further reading
  - PhD Thesis

External links
List of high schools in North Dakota from SchoolTree.org

North Dakota
School Districts

School Districts